The following notable people are from or have been associated with Appleton, Wisconsin.

Artists and performers 

 Judah Bauer, guitarist
 Willem Dafoe, actor
 Theodore Hardeen, magician
 Harry Houdini, illusionist and stunt performer
 Lynn Kellogg, singer
 Steven Krueger, actor
 Maury Laws, composer
 Jeff Loomis, guitarist
 Michael Patrick McGill, actor
 Roy Purdy, rapper
 Brenda Rae, operatic soprano
 Terry Zwigoff, filmmaker

Athletes and sports personnel 

 Esmir Bajraktarevic, MLS player
 Myrt Basing, NFL player
 Rocky Bleier, NFL player, four-time Super Bowl Champion
 Brian Butch, NBA player
 Mark Catlin Sr., football coach
 Clarence Currie, MLB player
 Matt Erickson, MLB, Manager Wisconsin Timber Rattlers
 Royal T. Farrand, physician and college football player
 Sarah Hagen, NWSL player
 J. P. Hayes, PGA golfer
 Joe Hietpas, baseball player
 George Hogreiver, MLB player
 Danny Jansen, MLB Player
 Roger Jenkins, hockey player
 Erik Jensen, NFL player
 Swede Johnston, NFL player
 Ross Kenseth, America Stock car racing driver
 Cole Konrad, first-ever Bellator Heavyweight Champion
 Ron Kostelnik, football player
 Tony Kubek, World Series champion baseball player and Hall of Fame broadcaster
 Stu Locklin, baseball and educator
 Garrett Lowney, Olympic medalist
 Jack Mead, NFL player
 Chester J. Roberts, head coach of the Miami RedHawks football and men's basketball teams
 Paul Schommer, Olympic biathlete
 Don Werner, MLB player
 Silas Young, professional wrestler

Authors and journalists 
Mary Agria, author
Gary Arndt, travel photographer and writer
Edna Ferber, author
Alfred Galpin, correspondent of H. P. Lovecraft
Henry Golde, author and Holocaust survivor
William Norman Grigg, author
Walter Havighurst, author
Gladys Taber, author
Greta Van Susteren, journalist, MSNBC television anchor

Businesspeople 
William Beverly Murphy, ex-president of Campbell Soup Company
Brad Smith, president and chief legal officer at Microsoft
Travis VanderZanden, founder of Bird Rides
Walter B. Wriston, banker

Military personnel 
John Bradley, Iwo Jima Navy flag-raiser
Zuhdi Jasser, doctor, former lieutenant Commander in the United States Navy
John S. Mills, U.S. Air Force Major General
Erik M. Ross, U.S. Navy Rear Admiral
William J. Van Ryzin, U.S. Marine Corps Lieutenant General

Politicians 

 George Baldwin, politician and businessman
 Clinton B. Ballard, Wisconsin State Representative
 Mark Catlin Jr., speaker of the Wisconsin State Assembly
 William F. Cirkel, Wisconsin politician and businessman
 Bob Corbin, former member of the Ohio House of Representatives
 Lorenzo E. Darling, Wisconsin State Representative
 Catherine Ebert-Gray, U.S. diplomat
 Harold Froehlich, U.S. Representative and Outagamie County Circuit Judge
 Charles J. Hagen, Wisconsin State Representative
 David Hammel, Wisconsin State Representative
 Leopold Hammel, Wisconsin State Representative
 William E. Hoehle, Wisconsin State Representative
 Steve Kagen, U.S. Congressman
 David M. Kelly, Speaker of the Wisconsin State Assembly and a Wisconsin State Senator
 William Kennedy, Wisconsin State Senator
 George Kreiss, Wisconsin politician
 August W. Laabs, Wisconsin State Representative
 John F. Lappen, Wisconsin State Senator
 James Lennon, Wisconsin State Representative
 James E. Lyons, Wisconsin State Representative
 Sue R. Magnuson, Wisconsin State Representative
 David Martin, Wisconsin State Representative
 Joseph McCarthy, U.S. Senator
 C. E. McIntosh, Wisconsin State Representative
 Talbot Peterson, Republican Party of Wisconsin chairman
 David Prosser Jr., Wisconsin Supreme Court Justice
 William J. Rogers, Wisconsin State Representative
 Sue Rohan, Wisconsin State Representative
 James Ryan, Wisconsin politician
 Samuel Ryan Jr., Wisconsin State Representative
 Oscar J. Schmiege, Wisconsin State Representative and jurist
 George J. Schneider, U.S. Representative
 Charles M. Schrimpf, Wisconsin State Representative
 David Schutter, criminal defense attorney
 Henry Clay Sloan, Wisconsin State Representative
 Perry H. Smith, Wisconsin politician
 John Tracy, Wisconsin State Representative
 William Smith Warner, Wisconsin State Representative
 Alexander B. Whitman, Wisconsin State Senator
 Jerry L. Wing, Wisconsin State Representative
 Bernard C. Wolter, Wisconsin State Representative

Other 
August Knuppel, mason and contractor
Ann McKee, neuropathologist specializing in traumatic brain injuries
John Benjamin Murphy, surgeon
Larry Rosebaugh, Roman Catholic priest
James Zwerg, civil rights activist

References 

Appleton
Appleton, Wisconsin
People from Appleton, Wisconsin